Ebere Paul Onuachu  (born 28 May 1994) is a Nigerian professional footballer who plays for Premier League  club Southampton and the Nigeria national team, as a forward.

Club career
Onuachu moved to Danish club FC Midtjylland in 2012, on a scholarship, from their affiliate team in Nigeria, Ebedei. He was a prolific scorer for their youth team, and made his first-team debut in the Cup later that year, before making his league debut in December 2012. In June 2013 he signed a new three-year contract with the club, before extending it for a further three-years in August 2015. In early 2015 he was loaned to Vejle BK, before returning to FC Midtjylland ahead of the 2015–16 season.

In August 2019 he signed for Belgian club Genk.

On 1 February 2023, Onuachu signed for  Premier League club Southampton on a three-and-a-half-year contract. On 4 February 2023, Onuachu made his first Premier League appearance for Southampton in a 3–0 defeat against Brentford, replacing Mohamed Elyounoussi at half-time.

International career
Onuachu was called up to the Nigeria under-23 national team in February 2015. In March 2019 he received his first call-up to the Nigerian senior team.

On 26 March 2019, Onuachu scored his first goal for Nigeria in a friendly match against Egypt. The goal was scored within the first ten seconds of the game, and the fastest ever scored for Nigeria. Following the goal Onuachu was heralded as the "toast of Nigerian football", with "his coach, team-mates, journalists and fans talking about him". He was selected to the Nigeria squad for the 2019 Africa Cup of Nations. He played in Nigeria's 1–0 win over Burundi.

Career statistics

Club

International

Scores and results list Nigeria's goal tally first, score column indicates score after each Onuachu goal.

Honours
Midtjylland
 Danish Superliga: 2014–15, 2017–18
 Danish Cup: 2018–19

Genk
Belgian Cup: 2020–21

Nigeria
Africa Cup of Nations: third place 2019

Individual
 Belgian First Division A Top goalscorer: 2020–21
 Belgian Professional Footballer of the Year: 2020–21
 Belgian Golden Shoe: 2021
 Belgian First Division A Team the Year : 2020–21

References

1994 births
Living people
People from Owerri
Sportspeople from Imo State
Nigerian footballers
Association football forwards
Nigeria international footballers
2019 Africa Cup of Nations players
Danish Superliga players
Belgian Pro League players
F.C. Ebedei players
FC Midtjylland players
Vejle Boldklub players
K.R.C. Genk players
Southampton F.C. players
Premier League players
Nigerian expatriate footballers
Nigerian expatriate sportspeople in Denmark
Expatriate men's footballers in Denmark
Nigerian expatriate sportspeople in Belgium
Expatriate footballers in Belgium
Nigerian expatriate sportspeople in England
Expatriate footballers in England